Amphiledorus is a genus of spiders in the family Zodariidae. It was first described in 2001 by Jocqué & Bosmans. , it contains 4 species.

References

Zodariidae
Araneomorphae genera
Spiders of Africa